Dawit is a given name. Notable people with the name include:

Dawit I, nəgusä nägäst (1382–1413), of Ethiopia, and a member of the Solomonic dynasty
Dawit II, Emperor Anbasa Segad, birth name Lebna Dengel (1501–1540), nəgusä nägäst (1508–1540) of Ethiopia
Dawit III, Dawit the Singer, nəgusä nägäst (1716–1721), of Ethiopia and a member of the Solomonic dynasty
Dawit Amanuel (1862–1944), the main translator of the New Testament in the Tigre language, published in 1902
Bruck Dawit, Ethiopian-American audio engineer and music producer
Dawit Isaak (born 1964), Swedish-Eritrean playwright, journalist and writer
Dawit Kebede (born 1980), Ethiopian print media journalist, winner of the 2010 CPJ International Press Freedom Award
Prince Joel Dawit Makonnen (born 1982), Ethiopian prince
Dawit Mebratu (born 1984), Ethiopian football midfielder
Dawit Wolde (born 1991), Ethiopian middle-distance runner who specialises in the 1500 metres
Dawit Yifru (born 1952), Ethiopian keyboardist and music arranger

See also
Awit (disambiguation)

Amharic-language names